The Bloodstone Lands is a module for the Forgotten Realms campaign setting for the 2nd edition of Advanced Dungeons & Dragons. It is also known by its product code FR9.

Contents
The book primarily details the two states of Vaasa and Damara and the rugged wilderness territory that surrounds it, known collectively as "The Bloodstone Lands." The book describes the area introduced in the H series of adventure modules, as well as that of The Icewind Dale Trilogy novels, and also includes 10 suggestions for adventure scenarios. The book provides an overview of the Bloodstone Lands, what their neighbors think, the societies of the Bloodstone Lands, its cities, towns, and villages, the geography of the region, its strongholds, ruins, and dungeons, the movers and shakers of the region, local travelling bands and organizations, and some information on how to run a campaign in the Bloodstone Lands.

Publication history
FR9 The Bloodstone Lands was written by R. A. Salvatore, with cover art by Larry Elmore, and was published by TSR in 1989 as a 64-page booklet with an outer folder. The book also features interior illustrations by Uttam, and cartography by Diesel. This is a 64-page booklet wrapped in a removable cover. Included with the book is a fold-out color poster map.

Th cover art is based on the painting "Deadlock" by Larry Elmore. It was also used for cover art in the 1996 video game Blood & Magic.

Reception

References

Forgotten Realms sourcebooks
Role-playing game supplements introduced in 1989